Modoc is an unincorporated community in Emanuel County, in the U.S. state of Georgia.

History
A post office called Modoc was established in 1888, and remained in operation until 1929. The community was named after the Modoc Indians.

The Georgia General Assembly incorporated Modoc as a town in 1912. The town's municipal charter was repealed in 1995.

References

Former municipalities in Georgia (U.S. state)
Unincorporated communities in Emanuel County, Georgia
Populated places disestablished in 1995